Vernon Township is a township in Van Buren County, Iowa, USA.

References

Van Buren County, Iowa
Townships in Iowa